The 1922 Columbus Panhandles season was their third in the league and last season as the Panhandles. The team failed to improve on their previous output of 1–8, losing all their games. They tied for fifteenth place in the league.

Schedule

Standings

References

Columbus Panhandles seasons
Columbus Panhandles
Columbus Tigers
National Football League winless seasons